Chitchanok Xaysensourinthone (born 23 August 1994) is a professional footballer who plays as a forward for Thai League 1 club Chiangmai. Born in Switzerland, Xaysensourinthone has represented Thailand at youth level.

Early life
Chitchanok was born in Lausanne. His father is Lao and his mother is Thai who own an Asian restaurant.

Career

Sampdoria 
At the age of thirteen Chitchanok joined the local team Yverdon-Sport's youth side, and after impressing at various Swiss youth levels had the opportunity to join Sampdoria's B team where he trained with future stars such as Mauro Icardi. A serious knee injury kept him out of the game for a year, but desiring to play for his mother's birthplace Chitchanok took the opportunity to join Buriram United with Charyl Chappuis, although because of that injury never made a first team appearance.

Muangthong United 
He then joined Muangthong United, although once again because of injury only played in the last game of the season where he scored a goal. BEC Tero Sasana's head coach Božidar Bandović was impressed by his performances though and had Chitchanok join his team. He scored his second professional goal in a win over Port F.C. in February 2015.

Suphanburi 
Chitchanok joined Suphanburi and as a teammate with Chappuis again in August 2015. He scored his first goal for Supahnburi to level the score with Muangthong United in 2-2 match on 8 November and selected as Goal.com's Young Player of the Week.

International career
He was first called up to the under-23 Thailand team in a friendly in 2015. Because of his Lao origins and birth in Switzerland, he is eligible to represent Thailand, Laos and Switzerland.

References

External links
 Chitchanok Xaysensourinthone at Goal
 Chitchanok Xaysensourinthone at Soccerway

1994 births
Living people
Sportspeople from Lausanne
Chitchanok Xaysensourinthone
Chitchanok Xaysensourinthone
Swiss men's footballers
Chitchanok Xaysensourinthone
Swiss people of Laotian descent
Swiss people of Thai descent
Association football forwards
Yverdon-Sport FC players
Chitchanok Xaysensourinthone
Chitchanok Xaysensourinthone
Chitchanok Xaysensourinthone
Chitchanok Xaysensourinthone
Chitchanok Xaysensourinthone
Chitchanok Xaysensourinthone
FC Chiasso players
Chitchanok Xaysensourinthone
Swiss Challenge League players
Swiss expatriate footballers
Swiss expatriate sportspeople in Thailand
Thai expatriate sportspeople in Switzerland